Ian Graham (born 7 April 1940) is a former Australian rules footballer who played with Essendon in the Victorian Football League (VFL).

Notes

External links 
		

1940 births
Living people
Australian rules footballers from Victoria (Australia)
Essendon Football Club players